Joe Black was an American right-handed pitcher in Negro league and Major League Baseball for the Brooklyn Dodgers, Cincinnati Redlegs, and Washington Senators.

Joe Black may also refer to:

 Joe Black (angel), the protagonist of the film Meet Joe Black
 Joe Black (album), a 1996 album by Malevolent Creation
 Meet Joe Black, a 1998 romantic drama film
 Joe Black (drag queen), drag queen and cabaret performer

See also
 Joe Blackledge (1928–2008), cricketer
 Joseph Black (disambiguation)